You Can't Argue with a Sick Mind is a live solo album by the American singer-songwriter and multi-instrumentalist Joe Walsh. The album was released in early 1976 as Walsh's last album for ABC Records. It was recorded live just before Walsh joined the Eagles. Three members of that group appear on the song "Help Me Through the Night".

Critical reception

Writing retrospectively for AllMusic, critic James Chrispell wrote of the album "Recorded live just before Joe Walsh joined up with the Eagles full-time... you've got one heck of a Joe Walsh concert souvenir."

Release history
The album was reissued in 1979 by MCA Records. In 2011 the album was reissued in Japan in a miniature replica sleeve in the SHM-CD format.

Track listing

Personnel 
 Joe Walsh – guitars, vocals
 Jay Ferguson – keyboards
 Dave Mason – keyboards
 Don Felder – guitar, vocals (5)
 Willie Weeks – bass guitar
 Andy Newmark – drums
 Joe Vitale – drums
  Rocky Dzidzornu – percussion
 Glenn Frey – vocals (5)
 Don Henley – vocals (5)

Production 
 Joe Walsh – producer
 Tom Flye – engineer 
 John Stronach – mixing
 Alex Sadkin – mastering 
 Jimmy Wachtel – art direction, design, group photography 
 Amanda Flick – additional artwork 
 Lorrie Sullivan – photography 
 Irving Azoff – management

Charts

References

Joe Walsh albums
Albums produced by Joe Walsh
Albums with cover art by Jimmy Wachtel
1976 live albums
ABC Records live albums